In a noise-measuring set, flat weighting is a noise weighting based on an amplitude-frequency characteristic that is flat over a frequency range that must be stated.

Notes
 Note 1:  Flat noise power is expressed in dBrn (f1 − f2) or in dBm (f1 − f2).
 Note 2: "3 kHz flat weighting" and "15 kHz flat weighting" are based on amplitude-frequency characteristics that are flat between 30 Hz and the frequency indicated.

References

Sources

Noise